Joshua Evan Christopher (born December 8, 2001) is an American professional basketball player for the Houston Rockets of the National Basketball Association (NBA). He played college basketball for the Arizona State Sun Devils. Christopher is often known as "Jaygup," a nickname created in his childhood.

Early life and high school career
Christopher grew up playing basketball with his older brother, Caleb, in elementary school, middle school and his first two years with Mayfair High School in Lakewood, California,and also the most prolific highlight of his career is where he played Servite High School the freshman underdog Joshua D Perez was going off against the 5 star recruit as well as on the Amateur Athletic Union (AAU) circuit. In his childhood, he often played against older opponents. As a sophomore at Mayfair, Christopher averaged 25.9 points, 6.5 rebounds, 4 steals, and 3.6 assists per game, leading his team to a 21–8 record. In his junior season, he averaged 25 points per game and won the Division 2AA championship. As a senior, Christopher was joined by Dior Johnson, one of the highest rated sophomores in the country. He averaged 29.2 points, 8 rebounds, 3.9 assists, and 3.1 steals per game, leading his team to the CIF Southern Section Division 1 quarterfinals. Christopher was selected to play in the McDonald's All-American Game, Jordan Brand Classic and Nike Hoop Summit, but all three games were canceled due to the ongoing coronavirus pandemic.

Recruiting
Christopher is a consensus five-star recruit and the number two shooting guard in the 2020 recruiting class. On April 13, 2020, he announced his commitment to Arizona State over Michigan, USC, Missouri and UCLA. His brother, Caleb had served 1 year there as well. As such, Christopher became Arizona State's highest-ranked recruit in the modern recruiting era and the program's first five-star recruit since James Harden in 2007.

College career
On November 26, 2020, Christopher scored a career-high 28 points for Arizona State in an 83–74 loss to third-ranked Villanova. As a freshman, he was limited to 15 games due to injury, and averaged 14.3 points, 4.7 rebounds, and 1.4 assists per game. On March 31, 2021, Christopher declared for the 2021 NBA draft.

Professional career

Houston Rockets (2021–present)
2021-22 season

Christopher was selected with the 24th pick of the 2021 NBA draft by the Houston Rockets. On August 7, 2021, Christopher signed with the Rockets. He made his summer league debut adding up 13 points, four assist, and five rebounds win against the Cleveland Cavaliers in 28 minutes. Christopher began his preseason debut playing around 11 minutes with 7 points, two rebounds, and one assist in a game loss against the San Antonio Spurs. He made his official NBA debut on October 20, coming off the bench with five points in eight minutes in a game loss against the Minnesota Timberwolves. On November 24, The Rockets assigned Christoper to the Rio Grande Valley Vipers. After averaging 20 points in three games with the Vipers, the rockets recalled Christoper. On December 8, Christoper logged 18 points in a 7 of 7 from the field with four threes on a 104-114 game win the Brooklyn Nets. Christopher began playing a major role for the Rockets throughout his rookie season coming off the bench averaging a decent amount of stats. He scored 23 points win four assists and five rebounds in the loss game against the Spurs. On March 23, 2022, Christopher adds up 21 points in a 139-130 overtime win against the lakers. On April 3, Christoper puts up his first 30 points with a well-performance from 11-of-14 of shooting, 3-of-5 from threes, three assists and two steals in a home game loss against the Timberwolves.

Throughout the 2021-22 season, Christopher played 74 games, averaging 7.9 points, 2.0 assists, and 2.5 rebounds, Christopher started out his rookie season in the G-league average of 20 points and was later promoted to a key role player to the rockets roster since November 29, 2021.

2022-23 season

The rockets announce that Christopher would enter the 2022 summer league. In the first game of the 2022 summer league, Christopher puts up 22 points with three blocks in a game loss against the Orlando Magic.

Player profile 
Christoper is highly suggest to be a top shelf athlete who showcases the power and explosiveness with his defense, passing and athleticism. Christopers Handles and speed can attack in transition and get to the rim for flashy dunks and layups. Sources compared his sizes and skills with Norman Powell and Jrue Holiday.

Career statistics

NBA

Regular season

|-
| style="text-align:left;"| 
| style="text-align:left;"| Houston
| 74 || 2 || 18.0 || .448 || .296 || .735 || 2.5 || 2.0 || .8 || .1 || 7.9

College

|-
| style="text-align:left;"| 2020–21
| style="text-align:left;"| Arizona State
| 15 || 15 || 29.7 || .432 || .305 || .800 || 4.7 || 1.4 || 1.5 || .5 || 14.3

Personal life
Christopher is the youngest of four siblings, all of whom have played basketball. His brother, Patrick, played professionally, including a brief stint with the Utah Jazz of the National Basketball Association (NBA). Patrick's godbrother is former NBA player Tayshaun Prince. Christopher's sister, Paris, played college basketball for Saint Mary's but suffered a career-ending injury as a freshman. His brother, Caleb, was a player for Arizona State University and is now a player for Tennessee Tech. Christopher's father, Laron, is a musician. His parents are devout Christians.

References

External links
Arizona State Sun Devils bio
USA Basketball bio

2001 births
Living people
21st-century African-American sportspeople
African-American basketball players
American men's basketball players
Arizona State Sun Devils men's basketball players
Basketball players from California
Houston Rockets draft picks
Houston Rockets players
McDonald's High School All-Americans
People from Lakewood, California
Rio Grande Valley Vipers players
Shooting guards
Sportspeople from Los Angeles County, California